Duthie is a surname. Notable people with the surname include:

 Augusta Vera Duthie (1881–1963), South-African botanist
 Conner Duthie (born 1997), Scottish footballer
 James Duthie (disambiguation)
 John Duthie (disambiguation)
 Gil Duthie (1912–1998), Australian politician
 Niall Duthie
 Thomas Henry Duthie
 William Duthie (disambiguation)

See also

References